The Church of Jesus Christ of Latter-day Saints in Georgia refers to the Church of Jesus Christ of Latter-day Saints (LDS Church) and its members in Georgia (U.S. state). The first branch in Georgia was organized in 1876. It has since grown to 87,908 members in 167 congregations.

Official church membership as a percentage of general population was 0.82% in 2014.  According to the 2014 Pew Forum on Religion & Public Life survey, roughly 1% of Georgians self-identify themselves most closely with The Church of Jesus Christ of Latter-day Saints. The LDS Church is the 8th largest denomination in Georgia.

Stakes are located in Athens, Atlanta, Augusta, Cartersville, Coal Mountain, Columbus, Conyers, Fayetteville, Kingsland, Lilburn, Macon, Marietta, Powder Springs, Roswell, Savannah, Sugar Hill, Tifton, and Winder.

History

In 1843, missionary work was briefly opened in Georgia by Elder John U. Eldredge.  Other missionaries followed to preach and to campaign for Joseph Smith in his presidential bid.  The campaign ceased in 1844 with the death of Joseph Smith, and missionary work halted in 1846.

Missionary work in Georgia resumed in 1878.  The Southern States Mission headquarters was established in Rome (60 miles north of Atlanta).  One early convert to the Church donated land and built a chapel at Mormon Springs in Haralson County.

Missionaries were initially treated well upon their return to the South, but before long their success led to violent opposition.  On July 21, 1879, Elder Joseph Standing was killed by a mob near Varnell's Station.  His companion, Rudger Clawson, escaped serious injury.  Unable to secure protection for missionaries, the church pulled out all missionaries in Georgia for the next decade. in 1889, a small group of members left to go west by Train.

Missionaries returned to Georgia in 1899, but slowly and cautiously due to disease and persecution. Ohio was added to the Southern States mission at the request of President Ben E. Rich, so he would have a place where ill missionaries could recover.

In 1930, branches were located in Atlanta, Augusta, Columbus, Macon and Savannah. Sunday Schools had been established in Cedar Crossing, Douglas, Empire, Glenwood, Milledgeville, and Thomaston.  That year, the state membership was 4,311.

LeGrand Richards, later a member of the Quorum of the Twelve, served as Southern States Mission mission president from 1934 to 1937, and wrote the outline for A Marvelous Work and a Wonder while in Atlanta.

In 1957, the Atlanta Stake was created, taking the northern two-thirds of the state with 3,000 members with wards in Atlanta (2), Columbus, Macon, and Empire. Branches for the stake was located in Buchanan, Athens, Gibson, Milledgeville, and Palmetto. The remainder of the state was covered by the Georgia-Florida and South Georgia districts.

Humanitarian relief
From Atlanta, hurricane and flood relief has been shipped to many areas of disaster including Hurricane Andrew, the Albany, Georgia flooding in 1994, Hurricane Opal, Hurricane Katrina as well as many other storms and disasters.

In December 1994, the Church donated 158,000 pounds of food through 26 religious and charitable organizations to the hungry in Atlanta. As various natural disasters, such as hurricanes, floods, and tornadoes struck Georgia and other areas across the south, Church members in Georgia responded to supply funds, goods, and volunteer help in the aftermath.

Southeast Area based in Atlanta
Though its headquarters is publicly in Salt Lake City, many operations for the North America Southeast Area operate through Atlanta.

In 1919 the headquarters of the Southern States mission moved to Atlanta under mission president Charles A. Callis. At that time, this mission stretched as far west as Arkansas and Louisiana, and as far north as Ohio.

In 1983, the Atlanta Georgia Temple was completed and dedicated, being the only temple in the Southeast United States for over 11 years.

Area headquarters in Atlanta include complete temporal and ecclesiastical distribution centers. Family Services for the North America Southeast Area is also based in Atlanta.

Missions
Atlanta, Georgia became headquarters for the Southern States Mission when it was opened in 1876 with Henry G. Boyle as president.  The mission covered the southern United States from Texas east. As more missions were created, the territorial coverage was reduced. In Jun 1971, the Southern States mission was renamed the Georgia-South Carolina Mission.  On June 20, 1974, it was renamed the Georgia Atlanta Mission.

Georgia is now home to two missions.

The Georgia Macon Mission which was organized in 2013 was disorganized in 2019.

Temples

On June 1, 1983 the Atlanta Georgia Temple was dedicated by President Gordon B. Hinckley.  For over 11 years (1983-1994), it served as the only temple in the North America Southeast Area.

See also

The Church of Jesus Christ of Latter-day Saints membership statistics (United States)
John Hamilton Morgan
Rudger Clawson

References

Further reading

External links
 Newsroom (Georgia)
 ComeUntoChrist.org Latter-day Saints Visitor site
 The Church of Jesus Christ of Latter-day Saints Official site

Church of Jesus Christ of Latter-day Saints in Georgia
Georgia